In Zoroastrianism, darvand, in its original Avestan form dregvant means 'wicked'. It is an ethical appellation of unrighteous persons. Angra Mainyu, the Evil Spirit, is a dregvant or darvand or wicked, as Spenta Mainyu, the Good Spirit, is ashavan or righteous.

In literature

In Anne Eliza Smith's novel "Seola" published in 1878, a darvand is a child of an angel and a human, usually a male angel and a woman. Devas (or angels) and darvands are defined early on in the novel on page 15 and again later on page 64.

References

Zoroastrianism
Persian words and phrases